is a 1991 independent Japanese film directed by Seijun Suzuki. It is a semi-fictional account of poet and painter Takehisa Yumeji. It also forms the final part of Suzuki's Taishō Roman Trilogy, preceded by Zigeunerweisen (1980) and Kagero-za (1981), surrealistic psychological dramas and ghost stories linked by style, themes and the Taishō period (1912-1926) setting. All three were produced by Genjiro Arato.

The film was screened in the Un Certain Regard section at the 1991 Cannes Film Festival.

Cast
 Kenji Sawada as Takehisa Yumeji
 Tomoko Mariya as Tomoyo
 Yoshio Harada as Sokichi Wakiya
 Masumi Miyazaki as Hikono
 Tamasaburo Bando as Gyoshu Inamura
 Reona Hirota as O-Yo
 Chikako Miyagi as Wet-nurse
 Kazuhiko Hasegawa as Onimatsu
 Michiyo Okusu as Landlady

Other
"Yumeji's Theme", written by Shigeru Umebayashi, features prominently in Wong Kar-Wai's 2000 film, In the Mood for Love.

References

External links
 
 
 Yumeji  at the Japanese Movie Database

1991 films
1990s Japanese-language films
1991 drama films
Japanese ghost films
Japanese independent films
Films directed by Seijun Suzuki
Films scored by Shigeru Umebayashi
Films set in the Taishō period
1990s Japanese films